The Northern Territory (Self-Government) Act 1978 is an Act of the Parliament of Australia that granted self-government to the Northern Territory.

References

External links
 Northern Territory (Self-Government) Act 1978 from AustLII

Acts of the Parliament of Australia
Northern Territory Government
1978 in Australian law